Rosie Casals and Billie Jean King defeated the defending champions Maria Bueno and Nancy Richey in the final, 9–11, 6–4, 6–2 to win the ladies' doubles tennis title at the 1967 Wimbledon Championships.

Seeds

  Maria Bueno /  Nancy Richey (final)
  Ann Jones /  Virginia Wade (semifinals)
  Rosie Casals /  Billie Jean King (champions)
  Judy Tegart /  Lesley Turner (semifinals)

Draw

Finals

Top half

Section 1

Section 2

Bottom half

Section 3

Section 4

References

External links

Women's Doubles
Wimbledon Championship by year – Women's doubles
Wimbledon Championships
Wimbledon Championships